FC Vinnytsia is a Ukrainian amateur football team from Vinnytsia. The club competes in the Amateur Championship since 2013.

History 

The club was founded in 2010 as FC Derzhsluzhbovets-KFKS Vinnytsia and competed in regional competitions of Vinnytsia Oblast.

In 2012 the club changed its name to FC Vinnytsia and in 2013 entered the national amateur competitions.

League and cup history

{|class="wikitable"
|-bgcolor="#efefef"
! Season
! Div.
! Pos.
! Pl.
! W
! D
! L
! GS
! GA
! P
!Amateur Cup
!colspan=2|Europe
!Notes
|-
|align=center|2013
|align=center|4th
|align=center|4
|align=center|10
|align=center|3
|align=center|2
|align=center|5
|align=center|12
|align=center|15
|align=center|11
|align=center|
|align=center|
|align=center|
|align=center|
|-
|align=center|2014
|align=center|4th
|align=center|3
|align=center|8
|align=center|4
|align=center|2
|align=center|2
|align=center|10
|align=center|6
|align=center|14
|align=center|
|align=center|
|align=center|
|align=center|
|}

External links 
  Official website. (Archived on 6 December 2014)

References

 
Vinnytsia, FC
Association football clubs established in 2010
2010 establishments in Ukraine
Vinnytsia
Sport in Vinnytsia